Senator Pocock may refer to one of two Australian politicans:

David Pocock, independent Senator for the Australian Capital Territory.
Barbara Pocock, Greens Senator for South Australia.